Steve Ritchie may refer to:
Steve Ritchie (pinball designer) (born 1950), American pinball designer
Steve Ritchie (footballer) (born 1954), Scottish football player
Steve Ritchie (businessman), CEO of Papa John's
Richard Stephen Ritchie (born 1942), known as Steve, U.S. Air Force officer